Thomas Fabbiano was the defending champion but lost to Evgeny Donskoy 6–3, 6–4 in the final.

Seeds

Draw

Finals

Top half

Bottom half

References
Main Draw
Qualifying Draw

Zhuhai Open - Men's Singles
Zhuhai Open